Sarah Vasey (born 29 August 1996) is a former British swimmer. She competed in the women's 50 metre and 100 metre breaststroke events at the 2017 World Aquatics Championships. Vasey qualified for the 50 metre breaststroke final at the 2018 Commonwealth Games, Gold Coast, Australia and went on to win gold.

Vasey was included in April 2021 as a member of the "high quality" British team to go to the postponed 2020 Olympics in Tokyo. She joined an "exceptionally high quality" swimming team which included Jacob Whittle, Abbie Wood and Molly Renshaw who are all from Derbyshire and also at their first Olympics

On the 23rd September 2022, Vasey announced her retirement from the sport.

References

External links
 
 
 
 
 
 
 

1996 births
Living people
British female swimmers
Place of birth missing (living people)
English female swimmers
Swimmers at the 2018 Commonwealth Games
Commonwealth Games gold medallists for England
Commonwealth Games medallists in swimming
European Aquatics Championships medalists in swimming
Swimmers at the 2020 Summer Olympics
Olympic swimmers of Great Britain
Universiade medalists in swimming
Swimmers at the 2022 Commonwealth Games
Commonwealth Games competitors for England
21st-century British women
Sportspeople from Derbyshire
Universiade silver medalists for Great Britain
Medalists at the 2019 Summer Universiade
Medallists at the 2018 Commonwealth Games